Convolvulus  is a genus of about 200 to 250 species of flowering plants in the bindweed family Convolvulaceae, with a cosmopolitan distribution. Common names include bindweed and morning glory; both names shared with other closely related genera.

Description
They are annual or perennial herbaceous vines, bines and (a few species of) woody shrubs, growing to 0.3–3 m tall. The leaves are spirally arranged, and the flowers trumpet-shaped, mostly white or pink, but blue, violet, purple, or yellow in some species.

Ecology
Many of the species are invasive weeds; but others are cultivated for their attractive flowers, while some are globally threatened.

Convolvulus species are used as food plants by the larvae of some Lepidoptera species, including the convolvulus hawk moth, the sweet potato leaf miner (Bedellia somnulentella) and the gem; the leaf miner Bucculatrix cantabricella feeds exclusively on C. cantabricus.

Gallery

See also
 List of Convolvulus species

References

External links

 
 Flora Europaea: Convolvulus

 
Convolvulaceae genera
Taxa named by Carl Linnaeus